Ubiquitin conjugation factor E4 B is a protein that in humans is encoded by the UBE4B gene.

The modification of proteins with ubiquitin is an important cellular mechanism for targeting abnormal or short-lived proteins for degradation. Ubiquitination involves at least three classes of enzymes: ubiquitin-activating enzymes, or E1s, ubiquitin-conjugating enzymes, or E2s, and ubiquitin-protein ligases, or E3s. 

This gene encodes an additional conjugation factor, E4, which is involved in multiubiquitin chain assembly. This gene is also the strongest candidate in the neuroblastoma tumor suppressor genes.

References

Further reading

External links